John Fogerty may refer to:

John Fogerty (engineer) (19th century), Irish millwright, architect, builder and civil engineer
John Fogerty (born 1945), American musician and lead singer for the group Creedence Clearwater Revival
John Fogerty (album)
John Frederick Fogerty (1863–1938), Irish architect and engineer

See also
John Fogarty (disambiguation)